The Canadian Screen Award for Best Stunt Coordination is an annual award, presented as part of the Canadian Screen Awards program to honour the year's best stunt coordination in Canadian film and television production. A single award is presented, for which work in both film and television projects is eligible.

The award was presented for the first time at the 9th Canadian Screen Awards in 2021.

2020s

References

Stunt
Stunt